Kozłówka  is a village in the administrative district of Gmina Kamionka, within Lubartów County, Lublin Voivodeship, in eastern Poland. The village has a population of 820.

In Kozłówka is located a Baroque/Classical palace, and the park is now a museum of the Zamoyski family. The museum also has one part dedicated to now unwanted communist sculpture and other art.

References

Villages in Lubartów County